Heikki Ilmari Savolainen (28 September 1907 – 29 November 1997) was a Finnish artistic gymnast. He competed in five consecutive Olympics from 1928 to 1952 and won at least one medal in each of them. In 1928, he won a bronze on pommel horse, which was the first-ever medal in gymnastics for Finland. Winning his last medal at the 1952 Summer Olympics in Helsinki, he became the oldest gymnastics medalist, at 44 years old; he delivered the Olympic Oath in the opening ceremony of those games. In 1932, Savolainen and his teammate Einari Teräsvirta had the same score on horizontal bar, but the Finnish team voted to give the silver medal to Savolainen. In 1948, he again had the same score as teammates Veikko Huhtanen and Paavo Aaltonen on pommel horse, and the gold medal was shared between the three.

At the world championships, Savolainen won only one medal, a team silver in 1950. Domestically, he collected 20 titles between 1928 and 1950, including six individual all-around titles in 1928–37.

Savolainen graduated as a physical education teacher in 1931, and a Doctor of Medicine in 1939, after which he started working as a doctor in his home town Kajaani, Finland. During the Winter War he served with the rank of lieutenant colonel as the head doctor in a military hospital. In parallel Savolainen worked for the Finnish sports magazine Urheilulehti in 1932–37. From 1946 to 1959 he served as vice-president of the Finnish Gymnastics Federation, and in 1946–56 as president of gymnastics federation of Kajaani, the town where he lived most of his later life.

Savolainen is the only Finnish gymnast inducted into the International Gymnastics Hall of Fame (2004).

See also
List of multiple Olympic medalists

References

External links

 
 
 

1907 births
1997 deaths
Finnish educational theorists
Finnish male artistic gymnasts
Finnish military personnel of World War II
Gymnasts at the 1928 Summer Olympics
Gymnasts at the 1932 Summer Olympics
Gymnasts at the 1936 Summer Olympics
Gymnasts at the 1948 Summer Olympics
Gymnasts at the 1952 Summer Olympics
Olympic bronze medalists for Finland
Olympic gold medalists for Finland
Olympic gymnasts of Finland
Olympic medalists in gymnastics
Olympic silver medalists for Finland
People from Joensuu
People from Kuopio Province (Grand Duchy of Finland)
Winter War
Medalists at the 1952 Summer Olympics
Medalists at the 1948 Summer Olympics
Medalists at the 1936 Summer Olympics
Medalists at the 1932 Summer Olympics
Medalists at the 1928 Summer Olympics
Medalists at the World Artistic Gymnastics Championships
Oath takers at the Olympic Games
20th-century Finnish people